Khalaf Masa'deh (died 20 February 2015) was a Jordanian politician and lawyer. He served as Justice minister in 1999. He founded the law firm Khalaf Masa'deh & Partners in 1968. He was the father of Ahmad Masa'deh.

References

Year of birth missing
2015 deaths
20th-century Jordanian lawyers
Justice ministers of Jordan